Borko Stefanović (born 5 February 1974 as Borislav Stefanović) is a Serbian politician who was the leader of the Levica Srbije political party. Prior to founding Levica Srbije, he was active in the Democratic Party in Serbia, with whom he engaged in a high-profile split in the summer of 2015. He was one of Serbia's representatives during the Belgrade-Pristina negotiations. He was the political director of Ministry of Foreign Affairs and former chief of staff for Serbian Foreign Minister Vuk Jeremić.

Early life
Stefanović was born in Novi Sad, Vojvodina, SFR Yugoslavia in 1974. He graduated from high school in Sremski Karlovci before enrolling in the University of Novi Sad Faculty of Law, where he graduated in 1999. Stefanović played bass guitar in a punk rock band called 'Generacija bez budućnosti' (Generation without a Future), which last performed in 2011.

Political career
Stefanović first became politically involved in 1999, when he joined the Citizens' Alliance (known in Serbian as GSS, the acronym for Građanski savez Srbije), an anti-nationalist party. He left the party in 2001, after which he had no party affiliation for two years.

Democratic Party (2003-2015)
After the assassination of Zoran Đinđić, Stefanović joined the Democratic Party in Serbia. In an interview with Novi Plamen, Stefanović referred to Đinđić's assassination when discussing on his entry into the Democratic Party, describing it as "my personal response to an uncivilized act."

In 2008, Stefanović was the chief negotiator of the sale of Naftna Industrija Srbije to Gazprom Neft. The sale did not involve a public tender, since other enterprises were not offered a chance to bid. The conditions to which Stefanović negotiated were criticized in the local media, as the price at which NIS was sold at approximately one fifth of its market value at the time. One of the most influential conditions of the sale was that the South Stream would run through Serbia, even though for Gazprom there was greater logistical convenience to bypass Serbia. The South Stream project was cancelled after the annexation of Crimea by Russia, which resulted in sanctions on Russian politicians and enterprises. In 2014, the Serbian government began an investigation on the privatization of NIS.

In December 2010, Stefanović was appointed by president Boris Tadić as Serbia's representative for the Belgrade-Pristina negotiations. In July 2011, Blic reported that Serbia's Minister of Foreign Affairs Vuk Jeremić attempted to replace Stefanović in his position in the Belgrade-Pristina talks. Jeremić sought to completely remove the Ministry of Foreign Affairs of having any participation in the talks, allegedly saying that his Ministry and the negotiations "have contradicting goals". However, according to Blic's sources, Boris Tadić did not approve Jeremić's removal of Stefanović from Serbia's negotiation team on Kosovo. On top of the allegations of Jeremić's attempt to remove Stefanović from the Kosovo talks, Stefanović was Jeremić's best man at his wedding. In September 2011, Jeremić replaced Stefanović as chief of staff of the MSP with Serbia's former ambassador to Slovakia, Danko Prokić.

Split from the Democratic Party
From 2015, Stefanović became engaged in a political rift with the Democratic Party. In a manifesto outlining several long-term goals, Stefanović argued for the creation of a "Confederation of the West Balkans", which would unite Serbia with other states in the Balkans, after which foreign debts of the united countries would be frozen for five years. He added, "I am not for any nationalization and I am for integration into the European Union, but I sympathetically see some parts of the program of the Greek Syriza." Stefanović argued against austerity, and was especially critical of pension and salary reductions for middle class citizens. He said that "the Democratic Party must make a drastic departure from our people who led wrongful policies, which like the current government were crazy about neoliberalism, but essentially were only moved to their personal gains." On December 10, 2015, Stefanović resigned from the Democratic Party. He said that the "last straw" was when the Democratic Party nominated Bojan Dimitrijević, who sought the rehabilitation of Milan Nedić, as a candidate in a local election in Čukarica.

Levica Srbije (Serbian Left)
Later in December 2015, Stefanović founded his own party, Levica Srbije (Serbian Left). While founding the new party, he initially collaborated with Jovo Bakić, who wrote most of the party's original ideological profile. However, Bakić quickly left the project after disagreements with Stefanović on the party's strategy and politics. Vladimir Unkovski-Korica, a political science professor at the University of Glasgow, commented on the Bakić-Stefanović split, claiming that "Borko Stefanović wants a party more like the Democratic Party in the United States, rather than like one of the leftist parties in Europe." In the 2016 Serbian parliamentary election, Levica Srbije recorded their debut election with 0.95% of the vote.

On November 23, 2018, Stefanović was injured from a physical assault while talking to an audience in Kruševac. He blamed the assault on incumbent president Aleksandar Vučić, who Stefanović accused of creating a "gruesome atmosphere" for opposition politicians.

References

1974 births
Living people
Politicians from Novi Sad
Serbian diplomats
Democratic Party (Serbia) politicians
Party of Freedom and Justice politicians
Members of the National Assembly (Serbia)
University of Novi Sad alumni
20th-century Serbian politicians
21st-century Serbian politicians